Joseph Sugden (July 31, 1870 – June 28, 1959) was a professional baseball catcher. He played in Major League Baseball from 1893 to 1912 for the Pittsburgh Pirates, St. Louis Browns, Cleveland Spiders, Chicago White Sox, St. Louis Browns and Detroit Tigers. He got a basehit in his final game on May 18, 1912, as a member of the coaching staff for the replacement Tigers called into service when the team went on strike to protest the suspension of Ty Cobb.

In his later years, Sugden was a scout for the St. Louis Cardinals, a position he held until his death in 1959 at the age of 88.

See also
 List of St. Louis Cardinals coaches

External links
 
 

1870 births
1959 deaths
Major League Baseball catchers
Baseball players from Pennsylvania
Pittsburgh Pirates players
St. Louis Cardinals players
Cleveland Spiders players
St. Louis Browns players
Detroit Tigers players
Chicago White Sox players
Philadelphia Phillies coaches
Vancouver Beavers players
19th-century baseball players
St. Louis Cardinals coaches
St. Louis Cardinals scouts
Charleston Sea Gulls players
Charleston Seagulls players
Toronto Canadians players
Albany Senators players
St. Paul Saints (AA) players
New Castle Nocks players
Sharon Travelers players